"Crazy for You" is a song recorded by American singer Madonna for the film Vision Quest (1985). It was released on March 2, 1985 by Geffen Records as the lead single from the film's soundtrack album. Film producers Jon Peters and Peter Guber, along with music director Phil Ramone, decided to use Madonna after listening to her previous recordings, employing John Bettis and Jon Lind to write the song. After reading the script of the film, Bettis and Lind wrote the song about the situation in which the lead characters meet at a nightclub. Initial recording sessions did not impress Bettis and Lind, and they felt that "Crazy for You" would be dropped from the soundtrack. However, a new version was recorded to their liking.

John "Jellybean" Benitez was the record producer of "Crazy for You", and it was a challenge for him, as previously he was associated with recording dance-pop songs only. Initially Warner Bros. Records did not want the song to be released as a single, since they believed that it would take away the attention from Madonna's second studio album Like a Virgin (1984). In the end, Peters and Guber convinced Warner officials to greenlight its release. "Crazy for You" ushered a new musical direction for Madonna, as  she had not previously released a ballad as a single. The track features instrumentation from snare drums, harp, bass synthesizer and electric guitar. Lyrically, the song speaks of sexual desire between two lovers and consists of innuendos.

"Crazy for You" received positive response from music critics and earned Madonna her first Grammy Award nomination in the Best Female Pop Vocal Performance category. The song became Madonna's second number-one single on the U.S. Billboard Hot 100, and reached the top of the charts of Australia and Canada. It also peaked at number two in Ireland, New Zealand and the United Kingdom, where it was released twice, in 1985 and 1991. Madonna has performed "Crazy for You" during the Virgin Tour in 1985, Re-Invention World Tour in 2004 and in some dates of Rebel Heart Tour in 2016. The performance from The Virgin Tour was included in the home video release on VHS and LaserDisc. "Crazy for You" appears on the compilation albums The Immaculate Collection (1990), Something to Remember (1995) and Celebration (2009). "Crazy for You" has also been covered by a number of artists.

Background 

"Crazy for You" was written by John Bettis and Jon Lind. The ballad was released as the first single from the soundtrack of the 1985 film Vision Quest, a coming of age drama about a high school wrestler, played by Matthew Modine. Film producers Jon Peters and Peter Guber and music director Phil Ramone were aware of the then unknown Madonna, who was just signed to Sire Records. Ramone took her for dinner at his house in Carolwood Records, where she played some of her music videos. Ramone and the other Warner executives present there, were impressed by Madonna's self-possession and fishnet-crucifix style, and they decided to test her voice in a New York studio. Peters assigned Joel Sill, an executive in charge of music at Warner Bros. Pictures, to handle the recording of the two songs for the film. Sill sent the script of the film to Bettis and Lind. After reading through the script, Bettis wanted to write a song about the situation where the main characters – a young boy and a girl boarding at a house – dance together at a nightclub. He elaborated:
"We were noodling around and 'Crazy for You' was something that Jon was singing over that section of the song. It was really descriptive of the scene in the film. [...] After that, I was out on vacation out in the desert and [Sill] called and said Phil Ramone was in love with the song and wanted to cut it on Madonna. [Laughing] 'Borderline' was out at that time and I said, 'Excuse me? This is for Madonna? Really? Can she sing a song like this?' Jon and I were surprised at the choice of artist at the time, if you want to know the truth."

Recording 
After Sill let Bettis and Lind know that Madonna was singing the song, some time elapsed before either of them heard anything from Warner Bros. Records. In between, they went to one of the recording sessions and were not impressed with the process of recording the song. Bettis commented, "We went to one of the sessions, and to be honest, that particular session did not go all that well. [...] Jon and I were depressed about the way the song had come out. We heard nothing else about it and we were a little nervous that the song was going to be dropped from the picture." Bettis went to England to work on the 1985 fantasy film Legend with music producer Jerry Goldsmith. It was there he received a call from Lind, who informed Bettis that a new version of "Crazy for You" was recorded and was made ready for a single release. Bettis was surprised and went over to Lind's house, where he warmly received the new recorded version of the song. It had a different arrangement from the demo version, and the arrangement was done by composer Rob Mounsey who rearranged the original track and added the background vocals. Bettis said: "We owe a big debt of gratitude to [Mounsey]. He really made a hit record out of [the song]." Mounsey was introduced in the project by record producer John "Jellybean" Benitez who was producing "Crazy for You". Benitez was previously associated with producing dance-pop themed songs and it was the first time that he produced a ballad. In Fred Bronson's The Billboard Book of Number 1 Hits, Benitez commented,
"The song was recorded live. It was the first time that I produced a live session, as opposed to having synthesizers and drum machines do everything. [...] I was tense because I had never done a record like this. [...] Everything I did was totally on instinct. I tried to make the song stand on its own, but at the same time work in the two scenes in which it was used in the movie."
Benitez also noted that "Crazy for You" was an important recording for Madonna, as the song being a ballad, was openly accepted at adult contemporary radios. She had already charted with her singles "Like a Virgin" and "Material Girl", hence Madonna wanted to prove that she can sing in a different genre of music. However, Warner initially did not want the song to be released as a single, since the release of Vision Quest coincided with the release of Madonna's second studio album Like a Virgin and releasing "Crazy for You" would have distracted attention from the album. Warner Bros. Records chief Mo Ostin went to Robert A. Daly, chairman of Warner, and requested him to pull out the Madonna tracks from the Vision Quest soundtrack. Daly summoned Peters and Guber to his office and informed them that they had to let-go of the Madonna tracks. Peters protested and shouted at Daly, resulting him escaping in fright and Warner allowing "Crazy for You" to be released as a single.

Composition 

"Crazy for You" was a new musical direction for Madonna, as she had not recorded ballad songs before. According to author Rikky Rooksby, the song is sophisticated compared to her previous singles. The introduction features a melody by a woodwind instrument and an electric guitar chord, sliding from one motif to the other. It has a snare drum on the last beat of the bar, leading to the spacey quality to most of the verses. Other instrumentation comes from a harp, a bass synthesizer and a chattering single note guitar lick. The fuller rhythm of the song does not start, until the chorus is reached. The turn of the melody allows Madonna's voice to stretch further on the higher notes.

According to the sheet music published at Musicnotes.com by Alfred Publishing, "Crazy for You" is set in the time signature of common time, with a medium tempo of 104 beats per minute. It is set in the key of E major with Madonna's voice spanning between the high note of C5 to the low note of G3. The song has a basic sequence of E–A–B–A as its chord progression. Unlike her previous singles, the chord sequence does not repeat itself and the chorus slowly unravels to the climax of the song. Lyrically, the song talks about extreme love for one another. It contains innuendos similar to the Crystals' 1963 song "Then He Kissed Me". According to scholar Dave Marsh, the lyrics talk about frank sexual desire among two teenagers. He believed that the line "I'm crazy for you, Touch me once and you'll know it's true" was not ambiguous and it helped Madonna to capitalize on such disambiguation.

Critical reception 
Keith Caulfield of Billboard said that "Crazy for You" is "perhaps the ultimate slow-dance song." Cash Box said that "though less infectiously danceable than her other two current singles 'Like a Virgin' and 'Material Girl'], 'Crazy For You' displays Madonna's voice in a different context, one that is more mature and ultimately marketable." Rikky Rooksby, author of The Complete Guide to the Music of Madonna, called the song sophisticated. Alex Henderson of Allmusic felt that the other Madonna song on the Vision Quest soundtrack, "Gambler", should have been the more successful single. Biographer J. Randy Taraborrelli characterized the song  as "sassy" and commented that the song provided proof that Madonna was vocally capable of delivering a serious ballad. Author Andrew Morton believed that the song cemented Madonna as a talented and serious singer which "had been missing from her past recordings." Allen Metz and Carol Benson, authors of The Madonna Companion: Two Decades of Commentary, said that the song sounded like a "remake of sweet-sixteen Connie Francis tune, dripping with old-fashioned, hand-held romance" especially in the line "It's so brand new; I'm really crazy for you." Edna Gundersen from USA Today felt that the song is "touching and beautifully arranged."

Dave Marsh, author of The Heart of Rock & Soul: The 1001 Greatest Singles Ever Made, felt that with the coda of the song, Madonna transformed her record into an adult love song. William McKeen, author of Rock and Roll is Here to Stay: An Anthology, said that the song "offered an aggressive sexuality for women". Maria Raha, author of Cinderella's Big Score: Women of the Punk and Indie Underground, said that with the song, "Madonna brought a trunk full of trite lyrics on the long-standing tradition of pop music, love."

"Crazy for You" was nominated for Best Female Pop Vocal Performance at 1986 Grammy Awards, but lost to Whitney Houston's "Saving All My Love for You". The song was ranked number 38 on VH1's "100 Greatest Love Songs", and during the special it was revealed that "Crazy for You" was recorded in one take. In 2003, Madonna fans were asked to vote for their Top 20 Madonna singles of all time by Q; "Crazy for You" was allocated the eleventh spot.

Chart performance 
In the United States,  "Crazy for You" became Madonna's second number-one single on the Billboard Hot 100. The song debuted on the chart at number 55 on the issue dated March 2, 1985. After 11 weeks, the song reached the top of the chart, replacing "We Are the World" by USA for Africa. "Crazy for You" was the second number-one song for Bettis as a songwriter, after "Top of the World" by the Carpenters (1973). With "Crazy for You", Bettis was in doubt whether the song would reach the top, after it was stuck at number two for three weeks, behind "We Are the World". Both he and Lind commented, "If you gotta lose to something, it might as well be 'We Are the World'. Luckily enough, the final week of the upsurge of the record, we topped 'We Are the World', which lets you know how hot the song and how hot the artist [Madonna] was."

"Crazy for You" was certified gold by the Recording Industry Association of America (RIAA) on July 16, 1985, for shipment of one million copies of the single across United States—the requirement for a gold single prior to 1989. The song reached number two on the Adult Contemporary Singles (behind "Rhythm of the Night" by DeBarge), and 80 on the Hot R&B/Hip-Hop Songs chart. It placed at nine on the year-end chart for 1985, with Madonna becoming the top pop artist for the year. In Canada, the song debuted at number 70 on the RPM issue dated March 16, 1985. On its eleventh week on the chart, the song reached the top position. It was present on the chart for a total of 25 weeks and was ranked seventh on the RPM Year-end chart for 1985. A music video was released, featuring Madonna singing the song in a night-club. The video was included in Celebration: The Video Collection, released in 2009.

"Crazy for You" reached number one in Australia and displaced another Madonna release, "Angel"/"Into the Groove", from the top spot on the Kent Music Report chart, making Madonna one of the few acts in Australian chart history to replace themselves at the number-one spot. After the song was released in the United Kingdom on June 8, 1985, it debuted at number 25 and peaked at number two. On February 18, 1991, the  QSound version of the song (as remixed by Shep Pettibone for The Immaculate Collection) was released and debuted in the peak position of number two in the Official UK Singles chart. It would equal the chart position of the 1985 original, as it was kept off the number-one slot by another record from the 1980s, namely "Should I Stay or Should I Go" by the Clash. "Crazy for You" was certified gold by the British Phonographic Industry (BPI) for shipment of 500,000 copies across United Kingdom. "Crazy For You" was 16th-best-selling single of 1985 in United Kingdom. Such was Madonna's popularity that when Vision Quest was released on home video in the UK it was renamed as Crazy for You, to cash in on her success. According to the Official Charts Company, the song had sold 782,000 copies there as of August 2017. "Crazy for You" was also a number-two hit in Ireland and New Zealand. The song reached the top 20 in Belgium, Europe, Japan, Netherlands, Spain, Sweden and Switzerland and top 40 in Austria, France and Germany.

Live performances 

Madonna first performed "Crazy for You" on the Virgin Tour in 1985. She wore a black top and long black skirt with her hair in knots and a crucifix attached. After an energetic performance of "Lucky Star", Madonna sat on some steps and sang "Crazy for You". Paul Grein, music editor of Billboard, commented that "She was at her best on 'Crazy for You', making good use of a deeper, huskier vocal quality that mirrors the song's deeper lyrical approach. The performance was included in the VHS release Madonna Live: The Virgin Tour recorded in Detroit, Michigan.

In the Re-Invention World Tour of 2004, Madonna performed the song in the last segment of the show, the Scottish segment. During that segment, she wore a Scottish kilt and a t-shirt which had different captions in different venues; usually it had the caption "Kabbalists Do It Better", however she also had "Brits Do It Better" and "Irish Do It Better" on the British and Irish stops of the tour, respectively. Generally after finishing the performance of "Papa Don't Preach", Madonna would dedicate the next song to the fans of twenty years, and start singing "Crazy for You" on top of a rising platform. At the end of the performance, she would usually throw her t-shirt to the audience. The performance was excluded from the album of the documentary on the tour titled I'm Going to Tell You a Secret, which was released in 2006.

On February 25, 2016, Madonna performed "Crazy for You" during the Manila stop of her Rebel Heart Tour as a tribute to the 30th anniversary of the 1986 EDSA Revolution. Before the performance she said; "I believe 30 years ago you fought for your freedom, am I correct? It's called People Power Freedom [sic], did I say that right? Up with democracy and freedom! That is the revolution of love. And that's what a rebel heart fights for. So on this very special occasion, I want to sing this song".

Cover versions and media appearances 

Philippine acoustic band MYMP recorded a cover version and released it their album New Horizon (2006). In 2007, Groove Armada recorded a cover with Alan Donohoe of art rock band the Rakes on vocals for the compilation Radio 1 Established 1967. New Found Glory recorded a pop punk cover of the song with Max Bemis for their 2007 album From the Screen to Your Stereo Part II. A cover of the song by Lion of Panjshir was included on the 2007 Madonna tribute compilation Through the Wilderness. Madonna impersonator Melissa Totten did a Hi-NRG cover for her 2008 dance album, Forever Madonna. An instrumental version was played in the Full House episode 13 Candles when Kimmy dares D.J. to kiss Kevin at her party. The original Madonna recording was also featured in the 2004 film 13 Going on 30, starring Jennifer Garner. At the end of the film, the song is played again, but to signify Jenna Rink's life staying on the "good path" 17 years later, and a bigger, modern rock/string orchestration by the film's composer Theodore Shapiro is added. Kelly Clarkson covered the song during her 2012 Stronger Tour per fan request in Bossier City, Louisiana. "Crazy for You" was also featured in the 2016 web film The Do-Over with vocals by Adam Sandler and David Spade.

Track listing and formats 

 US 7" single
 "Crazy for You" – 4:08
 "No More Words" (Berlin) – 3:54

 US 7" promo single
 "Crazy for You" – 4:08
 "Gambler" – 3:54

 Dutch 12" single
 "Crazy for You" – 4:08
 "I'll Fall in Love Again" (Sammy Hagar) – 4:11
 "Only the Young" (Journey) – 4:01

 UK 7" single (1985)
 "Crazy for You" – 4:00
 "I'll Fall in Love Again" (Sammy Hagar) – 4:11

 UK 7" single/cassette single (1991)
 "Crazy for You" (Remix) – 3:45
 "Keep It Together" (Shep Pettibone Single Remix) – 4:30

 UK 12" single/CD maxi-single (1991)
 "Crazy for You" (Remix) – 3:45
 "Keep It Together" (Shep Pettibone Remix) – 7:45
 "Into the Groove" (Shep Pettibone Remix) – 8:06

Credits and personnel 

 Madonna – lead vocals, background vocals
 John Bettis – writer
 Jon Lind – writer
 John "Jellybean" Benitez – record producer
 Rob Mounsey – music arrangement
 Greg Fulginiti – mastering

Credits adapted from the soundtrack's liner notes.

Charts

Weekly charts

Year-end charts

All-time charts

Certifications and sales 

|-
!scope="col" colspan="3"| Digital
|-

See also 
 List of Hot 100 number-one singles of 1985 (U.S.)
 List of RPM number-one singles of 1985
 List of number-one singles in Australia during the 1980s

References

Bibliography

External links 
 Lyrics of this song
 

1980s ballads
1985 singles
1984 songs
Billboard Hot 100 number-one singles
CBS Records singles
Geffen Records singles
Madonna songs
Number-one singles in Australia
Pop ballads
RPM Top Singles number-one singles
Sire Records singles
Song recordings produced by John Benitez
Songs written by Jon Lind
Songs written for films
Songs with lyrics by John Bettis
Split singles
Warner Records singles